Thomas Winkelmann (born 20 December 1959) is a German businessman and was the Chief Executive Officer (CEO) of the former German airline Air Berlin until it ceased operations in October 2017.

Early life
He was born in Hagen in North Rhine-Westphalia (Nordrhein-Westfalen). He studied Linguistics and Classics at the Free University of Berlin (Freie Universität Berlin) and the University of Münster (Westfälische Wilhelms-Universität). In 2004 he completed the AMP at Harvard Business School.

Career
He joined Lufthansa in 1998. He was the head of the company for Latin America and the Caribbean, based in Miami. He became Vice-President of Lufthansa for North and South America, based in New York in September 2000.

Germanwings
He became Chief Executive (Geschäftsführer) of Germanwings in September 2006, when it was owned by Eurowings, which was then headquartered in Dortmund. Germanwings was effectively bought by Lufthansa at the end of 2009.

He is also on the Board of Directors of JetBlue, an American low-cost airline.

Air Berlin
On 18 December 2016, it was announced that Winkelmann succeeded Stefan Pichler as CEO of Air Berlin in February 2017.

In October 2017, Air Berlin confirms that it will cease all of its own operations by 27 October 2017. The last flight of Air Berlin was operated by Airbus A320 D-ABNW in the same day. It departed from Munich at 21:36 and landed at Berlin Tegel at 22:45 at night.

Personal life
He lives in Berlin, with his wife and children. He watches Borussia Dortmund.

References

External links
 Biography
 Aviation conference

1959 births
German airline chief executives
Free University of Berlin alumni
Harvard Business School alumni
Lufthansa people
Air Berlin
People from Hagen
University of Münster alumni
Living people